Yamhill District and Morrison/Southwest 3rd Avenue are light rail stations on the MAX Blue and Red Lines in downtown Portland, Oregon. Located in the Yamhill Historic District, it is the 3rd stop eastbound on the current Eastside MAX. It was also the eastern terminus of the transit mall. It originally served the Yellow Line from 2004 to 2009 until its relocation to the Portland Transit Mall.

The stations are built into the sidewalks of Yamhill and Morrison Streets.

External links

Yamhill District station info
Morrison/Southwest 3rd Avenue station info

MAX Light Rail double stations
MAX Blue Line
MAX Red Line
Railway stations in the United States opened in 1986
1986 establishments in Oregon
Railway stations in Portland, Oregon
Southwest Portland, Oregon